Sailing competitions at the 2024 Summer Olympics are scheduled to run from 28 July to 8 August at Marseille Marina. The number of sailors competing across ten different classes at these Games has been reduced from 350 to 330, with an equal distribution between men and women. Furthermore, several significant changes are instituted in the sailing program for Paris 2024 to reinforce gender equality and vast diversity among the nations in the qualifying process.

Equipment and event changes
 The Laser, Laser Radial, 470, Nacra 17, 49er and 49erFX all return for 2024.
 The 470 is now a mixed event instead of having separate men's and women's events.
 The Finn has been dropped.
 The RS:X has been replaced with the IQFoil with both a men's and a women's event.
 The Formula Kite has been added with both a men's and a women's event.

Overview

Qualification 

The number of sailors competing across ten different classes has been reduced from 350 to 330, with an equal distribution between men and women. Aiming for vast gender equality and diversity among the nations, the World Sailing has ratified several amendments to the qualifying process.

The qualification period commences at the 2023 Sailing World Championships in The Hague, Netherlands, where 107 places, about forty percent of the total quota, will be awarded to the highest-ranked NOCs across ten different sailing classes. Fourteen places will be distributed to the sailors competing in the men's (Laser) and women's dinghy (Laser Radial) at the 2024 ILCA World Championships in Adelaide, Australia, while the highest-ranked NOCs vying for qualification will receive a single quota place in each boat, except for Laser and Laser Radial (three per gender for Asia and two for the rest) at their respective continental regattas (Africa, Asia, Central & South America, Europe, North America & Caribbean, and Oceania). 

The remainder of the total quota will be attributed to the eligible sailors through the 2024 Last Chance Regatta in Hyères, France (39 boats in total) and as part of the World Sailing Emerging Nations Program (two boats per gender each in windsurfing and dinghy). Four quota places (two per gender) are entitled to the NOCs competing in the men's Laser and women's Laser Radial under the Tripartite Commission.

As the host country, France reserves one quota place in each of the ten sailing classes.

Classes (equipment)

Competition schedule

Medal summary

Medal table

Men's events

Women's events

Mixed events

See also
Sailing at the 2022 Asian Games
Sailing at the 2023 Pan American Games

References

External links 

2024 Summer Olympics events
2024
Sailing competitions in France
2024 in sailing